Lamartine may refer to:

Alphonse de Lamartine (1790-1869), a French writer and politician, husband of Elisa
Elisa de Lamartine  (1790–1863), French painter and sculptor, wife of Alphonse
Gert Louis Lamartine (1898–1966), German painter, sculptor and interior designer
Lamartine Babo, Brazilian musician

Places 
Lamartine, Ohio, an obsolete name for a post office in Ohio
Lamartine, Wisconsin, a town in Fond du Lac County
Lamartine (community), Wisconsin, an unincorporated community located in the above town
Lamartine (shipwreck), off Gloucester, Massachusetts
Lamartine Place Historic District, in Manhattan, New York City
Lamartine, Quebec